The Nederlandsch-Indische Spoorweg Maatschappij (Dutch East Indies Railway Company), abbreviated NIS, was the railway company in charge of rail transport in Java, Dutch East Indies. The company's headquarters were in Semarang. The railway connected Semarang with Yogyakarta and Surakarta and in 1873 they also connected the Willem I Railway Station of Ambarawa and Kedungjati and Batavia. Later the network expanded to Bandung and Surabaya.

The company's iconic headquarters building in Semarang was designed by Cosman Citroen.

Gallery

See also
 Kereta Api Indonesia—a successor of the company.

References

External links
 

Defunct railway companies of Indonesia